Stegastes rectifraenum, commonly known as the Cortez damselfish or Cortez gregory, is a damselfish of the family Pomacentridae. It is native to the tropical eastern Pacific Ocean, its range including Baja California in Mexico, and the Gulf of California.

Status
Stegastes rectifraenum has a wide distribution and is common in many parts of its range and its populations appear to be stable. No particular threats have been identified and the IUCN rate it as being of "Least Concern".

References

External links
 

rectifraenum
Fish described in 1862